The 2013–14 Austrian Football First League was the 40th season of the Austrian second-level football league. It began on 19 July 2013 and ended on 5 June 2014.

Teams and locations

League table

Promotion/relegation playoffs

Teams

 Parndorf (finished 9th in First League)
 FAC Wien (champions of Regionalliga East)
 LASK Linz (champions of Regionalliga Central)
 Austria Salzburg (champions of Regionalliga West)

First leg

Second leg

FAC Wien won 5–2 on aggregate and were promoted to the Austrian First League

LASK Linz won 2–1 on aggregate and were promoted to the Austrian First League

References

2. Liga (Austria) seasons
2
Aus